Institute of Forest Biodiversity (IFB) is a research institute situated in Hyderabad in the state of Telangana, India. It works under the Indian Council of Forestry Research and Education (ICFRE) of  the Ministry of Environment, Forests and Climate Change, Government of India.

Divisions
 Forest Ecology and Climate Change
 Forest Genetics and Tree Improvement
 Extension and Publicity (ICTS)
 Mangroves and Coastal Ecology

See also
 Indian Council of Forestry Research and Education
 Van Vigyan Kendra (VVK) Forest Science Centres
 Social forestry in India

References

2012 establishments in Andhra Pradesh
Research institutes established in 2012
Nature conservation in India
Forest research institutes
Forestry education in India
Forestry agencies in India
Indian Council of Forestry Research and Education
Ministry of Environment, Forest and Climate Change
Research institutes in Hyderabad, India